Fermín Balbuena (born 7 July 1961) is a Paraguayan football manager and former international player who played for clubs from Paraguay and Chile.

Titles
 Olimpia 1988, 1989 and 1995 (Paraguayan Primera División Championship), 1990 (Copa Libertadores de América and Supercopa Sudamericana), 1991 (Recopa Sudamericana)

External links
 Fermín Balbuena at playmakerstats.com (English version of ceroacero.es)
 

1962 births
Living people
Paraguayan footballers
Paraguayan expatriate footballers
Paraguay international footballers
Club Olimpia footballers
Deportes Concepción (Chile) footballers
Chilean Primera División players
Expatriate footballers in Chile
Association football midfielders